Sedley is a village in the Canadian province of Saskatchewan within the Rural Municipality of Francis No. 127 and Census Division No. 6. This village is located at the intersection of Highway 33 and Highway 620. Sedley lies in a wheat-producing agricultural district.

History 
The Canadian Pacific Railway (CPR) rail branch line helped to settle this community. Sedley incorporated as a village on August 3, 1907. It was named for Sedley Blanchard, a lawyer.

Geography 
Wascana Creek runs just to the west of Highway 33.

Demographics 

Notable people 
Kelly Bechard, hockey player and Olympian. 
Carol Morin, broadcaster.

Published works 
Title  Outline history of Our Lady of Grace Church, Sedley, Saskatchewan : On the occasion of its 75th anniversary  Author Baker, Leonard, Mrs Published Weyburn, Sask. : Weyburn Review Ltd., 1981

See also 
List of communities in Saskatchewan
List of rural municipalities in Saskatchewan

References 

Villages in Saskatchewan
Francis No. 127, Saskatchewan
Division No. 6, Saskatchewan